Dewait is a village in the Azamgarh district of Uttar Pradesh, India, situated near the Mehnagar Market. It lies 15 km south of Azamgarh city, and is accessible from Varanasi, Jaunpur and Allahabad. Including the adjoining areas, the village has an estimated population of between 10,000 and 15,000 people. The village has a post office with the pin code 276204, and a dispensary run by state government.

History 
Dewait is the Place of Sa'adaat. The name was derived from Shah Deyat, an Arabic word meaning Blood Money. Dewait was donated by the King Haribans of Mehnagar to "Meer Sarfatah Husain" (Meera Baba — a well known name among neighbouring villages), against the blood shedding of Sa'adaat. Martyr Sa'adaats are believed to have migrated from the area of Babun Nahar in Iraq. In those years many Shiites of central Asia took refuge in India.

A few centuries ago, the Noble Family of Ahl-e-Sa'adaat migrated from the Holy City of Babun Nahar in Iraq to India. Some of them permanently settled near Azamgarh city, a district of Uttar Pradesh, and named the area Babun Nahar after their native village. It is now called Sapnahar (a modified name from Babun Nahar, then Babnahar, and now Sapnahar) and is one kilometre from present Dewait. Only the graveyard of Meer Sarfatah Husain (Meera Baba) is there, now a worship place for non Muslims. Muslims go there only on Shab-e-Barat, an Islamic religion occasion, to offer prayers.

Religion and demography 

Residents of Dewait are referred as Azmi because of Azamgarh District.

Approximately 300 to 500 of the Muslims are Twelver Shiites from the Rizvi Clan.

References

External links 
http://travelspedia.com/South-Asia/India/Uttar-Pradesh/8233.html
http://www.whereincity.com/india/pincode/uttar-pradesh/azamgarh.htm
http://shailendrasinghazamgarh.blogspot.com/2008_07_01_archive.html
http://wikimapia.org/7969043/dewait
http://sthweb.bu.edu/shaw/anna-howard-shaw-center/biography?view=mediawiki&article=Dewait

Villages in Azamgarh district